The 2008 Croatian Cup Final was a two-legged affair played between Hajduk Split and Dinamo Zagreb. 
The first leg was played in Zagreb on 7 May 2008, while the second leg on 14 May 2008 in Split.

Dinamo Zagreb won the trophy with an aggregate result of 3–0.

Road to the final

First leg

Second leg

References

External links
Official website 

2008 Final
GNK Dinamo Zagreb matches
HNK Hajduk Split matches
Cup Final